Mohammedali Shihab Thangal (4 May 1936 – 1 August 2009), known with the honorific prefix Sayed, was an Indian community leader, Islamic scholar and politician from Kerala. He is sometimes regarded as "the most important Mappila leader" of modern Kerala.

Born in the Yemeni-origin sayyid (thangal) Pukkoya family of Panakkad, Shihab Thangal also functioned as the president of the Kerala state committee of the Indian Union Muslim League (1975 - 2009).  

According to historian Roland Miller, "'wisely and sensitively, he led Muslims through the landmines of state politics for over three decades. He also led the way into cordial relationships with members of other religious communities".

Early life and education
Shihab Thangal was born as the eldest son of P. M. S. A. Pukkoya Thangal, of the Pukkoya family of Panakkad, on 4 May 1936. His siblings were Umerali Shihab Thangal, Hyderali Shihab Thangal, Sadiq Ali Shihab Thangal, Abbasali Shihab Thangal.

Shihab Thangal had his primary education at Panakkad and at M. M. High School, Kozhikode (matriculation). He also had his initial Islamic education at the traditional 'dars' at Tirur and Kananchery.

Higher education in Egypt 
In 1958, Shihab Thangal left for Egypt for further studies and obtained his master's degree in Arabic Literature from Al-Azhar University in 1961. He continued his studies in Cairo University and pursued a Doctorate in Arabic Literature and Philosophy in 1966.

Shihab Thangal was well versed in English and French. He was also known for his enthusiasm for Sufi-poetry. On return to Kerala, the thangal married Sharifa Fatima Beevi, daughter of Sayed Bafaqy Thangal.

Public life
Shihab Thangal became the president of the Kerala state committee of Indian Union Muslim League after his father Pukkoya Thangal's death in 1975. He remained president until his own death in 2009. Shihab Thangal is distinctly remembered for his role in preserving communal harmony in Kerala (at the most tense times like demolition of Babur's Mosque in 1992). 

Shihab Thangal was also qadi to hundreds of 'mahals' in Kerala. He was the president of numerous educational institutions such as Jamia Nooriya, which were managed by the Samastha. He was behind the proposal to start another campus of Aligarh Muslim University in Kerala.
Shihab Thangal died on 1 August 2009 following a cardiac arrest.

See also
Sadiq Ali Shihab Thangal
Indian Union Muslim League

References

External links

Biography - Shihab Thangal (Malayala Manorama)

1936 births
2009 deaths
Malayali politicians
Mappilas
People from Malappuram
Cairo University alumni
Islam in Kerala
Al-Azhar University alumni
Indian Union Muslim League politicians
Kerala Sunni-Shafi'i scholars
Indian Sunni Muslims